Desafío en Río Bravo/Gunmen of the Rio Grande (is a 1964 Italian, Spanish and French international co-production Spaghetti Western film directed by Tulio Demicheli.  Filmed at Almería, Spain and shot in Techniscope, it stars Guy Madison as Wyatt Earp in his first leading spaghetti western role.

Plot
Saloon keeper Jennie Lee is fed up with Zack "The Snake" Williams trying to take over Clementine Hewitt's silver mine.  She contacts her friend Wyatt Earp to bring justice to the Arizona Territory.

Cast

Notes

External links
 

1964 films
1964 Western (genre) films
Spaghetti Western films
Italian Western (genre) films
French Western (genre) films
Spanish Western (genre) films
1960s Italian-language films
Cultural depictions of Wyatt Earp
Films shot in Almería
Films scored by Angelo Francesco Lavagnino
1960s Italian films
1960s French films